The 2019 All-Ireland Under-20 Hurling Championship was the inaugural staging of the All-Ireland Under-20 Championship and the 56th staging overall of a hurling championship for players between the minor and senior grades. Prior to 2019 an All-Ireland Under-21 Championship was held. The championship began on 25 May 2019 and ended on 24 August 2019.

Tipperary were the defending champions.

On 24 August 2019, Tipperary won the championship following a 5-17 to 1-18 defeat of Cork in the All-Ireland final. This was their 11th All-Ireland title overall and their second title in succession.	
 
Offaly's Cathal Kiely was the championship's top scorer with 0-44.

Team summaries

Provincial championships

Leinster Under-20 Hurling Championship

Play-off round 1

Play-off round 2

Quarter-finals

Semi-finals

Final

Munster Under-20 Hurling Championship

Quarter-final

Semi-finals

Final

All-Ireland Under-20 Hurling Championship

Semi-finals

The Leinster champions play the Munster beaten finalists and the Munster champions play the Leinster beaten finalists.

Final

Championship statistics

Top scorers

Top scorers overall

Top scorers in a single game

References

External links
Bord Gais Energy Leinster U-20 Hurling Championship 2019
Munster Under-20 Hurling Championship fixtures
All-Ireland Under-20 Hurling Championship

Under-20
All-Ireland Under-20 Hurling Championship